Werner Karlsson (8 July 1887 – 5 February 1946) was a Swedish cyclist. He competed in two events and won gold at the 1912 Summer Olympics.

References

External links
 

1887 births
1946 deaths
Swedish male cyclists
Olympic cyclists of Sweden
Cyclists at the 1912 Summer Olympics
People from Gnesta Municipality
Sportspeople from Södermanland County